The Dixmude was a Zeppelin airship built for the Imperial German Navy as L 72 (c/n LZ 114) and unfinished at the end of the First World War, when it was given to France as war reparations and recommissioned in French Navy service and renamed Dixmude. It was lost when it exploded in mid-air on 21 December 1923 off the coast of Sicily, killing all 52 (42 crew and ten passengers) on board. This was one of the first of the great airship disasters, preceded by the crash of the British R38 in 1921 (44 dead) and the US airship Roma in 1922 (34 dead), and followed by the destruction of the USS Shenandoah in 1925 (14 dead) the British R101 in 1930 (48 dead), the USS Akron in 1933 (73 dead) and the German Hindenburg in 1937 (36 dead).

Name
The ship was named after the Belgian city of Diksmuide (French: Dixmude), and specifically, in honour of the Fusiliers Marins at the battle of Diksmuide. It was the first of three ships named Dixmude.

History
The L 72 was the third and final Zeppelin of the X class built for the Imperial German Navy. The L 72 was originally built with the intention to bomb New York City, a mission never carried out due to the end of the first World War. Completed after the war's end, the L 72 made its first flight on 9 July 1920 and was surrendered to the French authorities four days later, when it was flown by a German civilian crew from Friedrichshafen to Maubeuge and was recommissioned as Dixmude in honour of the French marines who had died in the defence of Diksmuide in 1914. Under the command of lieutenant Jean du Plessis de Grenédan it was then flown across France to the naval air base at Cuers-Pierrefeu near Toulon.

Dixmude was grounded for the next three years. An attempt was made to reinflate it in 1921, revealing that the original gasbags had deteriorated too much for this to be possible. Although new gasbags could have soon been supplied by the Zeppelin company, the French preferred to have their own made in France, resulting in a two-year delay while the technique of using gold beater's skin was mastered. These were delivered in June 1923 and proved less than satisfactory; many small tears appeared, possibly due to the use of an inferior quality of cotton.  An ambitious plan to fly across the Sahara to Dakar was approved, and in order to prepare for this a program of trials was begun.

On 2 August 1923, Dixmude made an 18-hour trip to Corsica. Between 30 August and 2 September, it made a  trip to North Africa, passing over Algiers, Tunis and Bizerte, and returning via Sardinia and Corsica.

On 25 September at 07:55 Dixmude left Cuers, crossing the Mediterranean to Algiers and then turned westwards, following the coast to Bizerta and then turning south, flying over Sousse  and Sfax where it turned inland towards Touggourt. The return flight over the Mediterranean was delayed by a storm which initially caused du Plessis to turn back to Bizerte, but after the weather cleared a successful crossing was made. On reaching Cuers conditions were so favourable that the flight was continued to Bordeaux and then to Paris, which was reached at dawn on 28 September. It then returned to Cuers, which was reached at 8 pm, but, still having fuel on board, then flew to Nice and back, finally mooring at Cuers at 06:30 on 29 September. The flight had lasted 118 hours and 41 minutes and covered 

This was followed between 17 and 19 October by a flight undertaken for publicity purposes in which it overflew cities in the south and west of France including Toulouse, Nantes, Bordeaux and Lyon.

On 18 December Dixmude left Cuers with the intention of making a return flight to In Salah, an oasis deep in the Sahara, carrying a crew of 40 and 10 passengers. In Salah was reached at 4 pm on the 19th; the airship did not land, but dropped a bag of mail from the crew. The intention had been to make a stop at the Baraki airfield near Algiers; a north-west headwind caused du Plessis to alter course to the east, and was seen crossing Tunisia on the evening of the 20th. The last radio message received from Dixmude was sent at 02:08, the airship reporting that it was reeling in its radio antenna due to a thunderstorm.

Railway workers in Sciacca, Sicily, were preparing to take out a train due to leave at 02:30 when they saw the sky to the west light up, the glow then sinking out of sight behind a hill, while a hunter on the seashore, watching the thunderstorm, saw a flash of lightning strike a cloud, followed by a red glare inside the cloud and four burning objects falling from the cloud. In the morning two aluminium fuel tanks were washed up, bearing the numbers "75 L-72" and "S-2-48  LZ-113" and various other debris, including charred scraps of fabric and even fragments of the duralumin girders. However, news of these events did not reach the outside world for several days; the French government, unwilling to admit the possibility of the airship's loss for political reasons, apparently suppressed these reports and issued its own series of false reports of rumoured sightings of Dixmude, suggesting that it had been blown inland over Africa. It was not until 26 December, when fishermen found a body, identified as du Plessis by documents found in the pockets, that the loss of Dixmude was acknowledged. His watch was stopped at 02:27. Only one other body was recovered, that of radioman Antoine Guillaume, which was recovered four months later.

Specifications

Citations

Sources and references 
 Robinson, Douglas H., Giants in the Sky. Henley-on Thames: Foulis, 1973 
 Robinson, Douglas H., Mystery of the Dixmunde. Journal of the American Aviation Historical Society, Summer 1964
 Dixmude : l'histoire oubliée d'un dirigeable de la Marine
 Le Dixmude
 Cuers-Pierrefeu Aerodrome with Dixmude Memorial

Airships of France
Aviation accidents and incidents in 1923
Hydrogen airships
Zeppelins
Accidents and incidents involving balloons and airships
Aviation accidents and incidents in Italy
Aviation accidents and incidents involving in-flight explosions